This is an index of drinking establishment-related articles.

Types of drinking establishment
 Alcohol-free bar
 Australian pub
 Bar
 Beer hall
 Biker bar
 Bloodhouse
 Botequim
 Brewpub
 Cantina
 Cider house
 Cigar bar
 Dance bar
 Desi pub
 Dive bar
 Drinking establishment
 Fern bar
 Gastropub
 Gay bar
 Gothenburg Public House System
 Honky-tonk
 Hookah lounge
 Host and hostess clubs
 Ice bar
 Inn
 Irish pub
 Izakaya
 Juke joint
 Lesbian bar
 Micropub
 Nightclub
 Pub (British)
 Ratskeller
 Roadhouse
 Shebeen
 Sly-grog shop
 Speakeasy
 Tavern
 Tied house
 Tiki bar
 Western saloon

Lists of pubs
 List of award-winning pubs in London
 List of fictional bars and pubs
 List of former public houses and coffeehouses in Boston
 List of pubs in Australia
 List of pubs in Dublin
 List of pubs in London
 List of pubs in Sheffield
 List of pubs in the United Kingdom
 List of pubs named Carpenter Arms
 List of real London pubs in literature
 Pubs and inns in Grantham

Bar terminology
 Bar-back
 Bartender
 Bartending terminology
 Beer engine
 Beer garden
 Cocktail waitress
 Flair bartending
 Happy hour
 Ladies' night
 Last call

Other

A 
 Act of Parliament clock
 Alcohol licensing laws of the United Kingdom
 Anti-Saloon League

B 

 Beerhouse Act 1830
 Birmingham pub bombings

C 

 Campaign for Real Ale
 Cheers (sitcom)
 Classic cocktail

E 
 Eire Pub, Dorchester, Massachusetts, visited by presidents and prime ministers and political candidates

G 
 The Good Pub Guide
 Guildford pub bombings

I 
 Ice luge

J 
 J D Wetherspoon

K 
 King Street Run

L 

 List of microbreweries
 Longest bar in Australia

M 
 Microbrewery

N 
 National Pub of the Year

P 
 Pub chain
 Pub church
 Pub crawl
 Pub Design Awards
 Pub games
 Pub Golf
 Pub names
 Pub Philosophy

 Pub quiz
 Pub rock (Australia)
 Pub rock (United Kingdom)
 Pub song
 Pub token
 Public houses of Montevideo
 Punch Taverns

R 
 Rail Ale Ramble

S 

 SantaCon
 Six o'clock swill
 Skeptics in the Pub
 Stonegate Pub Company

W 
 World of Pub (sitcom)
 The World's End (film)

Z 
 Zombie Pub Crawl

See also
 Alcoholic beverage
 Beer and breweries by region
 Cocktail
 Drinking culture
 Drinking game
 List of alcoholic beverages
 List of bartenders
 List of cocktails
 List of drinking games
 Mixed drinks

External links

List
Drinking establishments
Drinking culture
Hospitality industry